Emerald is a town in the Greater Melbourne area of Victoria, Australia, 44 km south-east of Melbourne's Central Business District, located within the Shires of Cardinia and Yarra Ranges local government areas. Emerald recorded a population of 5,890 at the 2021 census.

Emerald also includes Cardinia Reservoir, Melbourne's second largest reservoir.

History

The Emerald Post Office opened on 22 December 1899.

Attractions

Puffing Billy and Emerald Lake

Emerald is known for the Emerald Lake (Lake Treganowan). The lake offers barbecue facilities, children's playgrounds, a pool, paddle boats, walking tracks, fishing, Environment Centre, model railway, café, and a railway station on the Puffing Billy Railway.

The Puffing Billy Railway is a heritage steam-operated railway, opened in 1900, which runs between Belgrave and Gembrook, recreating the 1920s heyday of this narrow-gauge line. It has three stations within Emerald: at Emerald itself, Nobelius and Lakeside, with Nobelius being a "stops-if-required" station. There is also Nobelius Siding, located at the former Nobelius Nurseries Packing Shed, between Emerald and Nobelius stations. It is only used for functions, or the regular "Dinner Train".

Other attractions

The areas around Emerald are excellent for finding chanterelles and other edible mushrooms, and are a popular destination for mushroom hunters each autumn.
There is also an Emerald and District museum set in the Nobelius Heritage Park. It adjoins Emerald Lake Park.

Events

Emerald FunFest

FunFest is a day-long family street party event which kicks off the PAVE Festival which runs annually for 7–10 days in April. On FunFest day there are road closures on the northern part of Kilvington Drive, all of Puffing Billy Place and the western part of Heroes Avenue, to prevent motor vehicle traffic entering, allowing many stalls to be established and enjoyed by the thousands of local residents and visitors that attend the event. FunFest has a great community feel with stalls, music, dance and plenty of free entertainment for all ages. The FunFest was preceded for many years by the Emerald WinterFest which was held annually in July.

Great Train Race
The Great Train Race (GTR) was an annual fun run from Belgrave to Emerald Lake in which participants attempt to beat Puffing Billy to the finish line and is organised by volunteers of the Puffing Billy Preservation Society.

The route from Belgrave to Emerald Lake which participants run is 13.2 km long, and in 2006 had 2,403 participants in the 25th Great Train Race. Participants of the GTR may win prizes; The first Male and Female runners of the 2007 GTR held on 6 May received a return flight to Antarctica as well as a unique Great Train Race trophy. For details on the Great Train Race, visit Great Train Race.

PAVE Arts Festival
The PAVE Festival is the largest festival in the Dandenong Ranges and Cardinia Shire, running over 7–10 days and incorporating all forms of the Arts. PAVE stands for "Performing And Visual arts in Emerald", which is an Annual Festival which takes place every year in mid April, having started in 2006. The festival includes a number of activities taking place at different locations around Emerald over a number of days. Such activities include the Emerald Arts Society art exhibition at the Environment Centre at Emerald Lake, a burlesque dance and circus performance, the popular "Women in Song" featuring 4 female singer songwriters, live Comedy, a photography exhibition, an exhibition and demonstration of local art courses and lessons, The Emerald FunFest, Literary events such as Poet's Breakfast, Yarn Event and Golden Cow Literary night, Voice concert, classical performance by Dandenong Ranges Orchestra, Storytelling, Open Gardens, a historic tour of Emerald and top quality live music. The 2011 festival featured Joe Camilleri and the Black Sorrows, The Ska Vendors and Kerri Simpson, Lloyd Spiegel, Lily and King.

Other events
For many years, Emerald had an annual Carols by Candlelight at Worrell Reserve. However, it ceased to run in 2009 due to insurance issues.
It moved instead to a smaller version at St. Mark's Church.

Cardinia Reservoir

Cardinia Reservoir is situated entirely in Emerald, Victoria. It is south of the main township and the southern border of the suburb follows the Reservoir Boundary. It is the second largest reservoir in Melbourne's water supply.

Cardinia Reservoir Park
On the southern side of the reservoir there is a large park run by Parks Victoria. Facilities include barbecues and toilets and is open every day of the year. The park is home to many species of wildlife including Kangaroos, Wombats and Possums. It is even possible to walk across one of the dam walls at the park. Despite being predominately located in the suburb of Emerald, the entrance to the park is approximately 10 minutes drive out of Emerald in Narre Warren East.

Cardina Reservoir is the designated place to hold water when the Desalination plant is operating. There is a pipe running between Wongthaggi and Cardina Reservoir to make this possible.

Education

Emerald has a Kindergarten and a Pre School, Emerald Primary School (with roughly 400 students) which serves the local area and a secondary school, Emerald Secondary College which serves the Southern Dandenong Ranges region. Emerald has its own library at Worrell Reserve as part of the Casey Cardinia Library Corporation.

The Emerald Community House runs adult education, pre-accredited ACFE training courses and hobby courses. There are also childcare programs, out of school hours care and children's extension programs and disability services.  The University of the Third Age (U3A) is located in U3A House, 402 Main Street.

Emergency services

Emerald has a part-time Police Station, a full-time Ambulance Station as well as a volunteer CFA Brigade and SES Unit. The Emerald Fire Brigade is located on Emerald-Monbulk Road near the roundabout of Belgrave-Gembrook Road, and attends approximately 190 Emergency Incidents per year. The Brigade trains on Wednesday evenings and Sunday mornings and new members are always welcome.

The Emerald Volunteer State Emergency Service Unit is located at 277 - 287 Belgrave-Gembrook Rd. It attends several hundred storm and wind damage incidents every year and also attends 20–30 road accidents a year for rescue purposes using such tools as the jaws of life. The Unit trains on Monday evenings and new members are very welcome to join.

Demographics

Emerald's population as of the 2006 Census was 6,135 (a decrease of 9 from the 2001 census), (3,050 male, 3,085 female), 4,662 people were aged 15 years and over (2,280 male, 2,382 female) and 460 were aged 65 years and over (200 male, 260 female).

According to the 2001 Census, 17 people identified themselves as indigenous persons (comprises Aboriginal and Torres Strait Islander).

5,461 are Australian Citizens, while 4,770 people were identified as having been born in Australia. 1,365 were born overseas. 5,608 people speak English alone.

Sport and recreation

The town has an Australian Rules football team competing in the Yarra Valley Mountain District Football League and a basketball team competing in the Knox Amateur Basketball Association.
Emerald also consists of a tennis club and a netball club.

Emerald is also home to Kreationz Cheerleading and Dance School where the local children and young adults compete statewide and nationally. Kreationz also perform for the locals at local fates, markets and events. 

'Emerald City School of Dance' have dance classes for children and adults.  Classes are held at the Emerald Community House.

Emerald Cricket Club celebrated its 125-year anniversary in 2018.

Retailers in Emerald

Emerald has many retailers consisting of small specialty shops such as Gingers Hairdressing, Tinkars Corner, Wild Things Florists and Resale Therapy as well as a Ritchies IGA supermarket and Woolworths supermarket and local take-aways such as The Chookery, Captains of Emerald Fish and Chips and Emerald Thai.

Media

Local media

Emerald receives standard Melbourne Television and radio broadcasts. However Emerald also has its own local radio station 3MDR, located in the Emerald Hall. 3MDR broadcasts are aimed at the Dandenong Ranges region with Volunteer staff and announcers.

The two local newspapers are the Ranges Trader Mail and the Free Press Leader. However neither paper is actually published in Emerald.

The monthly Signpost magazine is also published in Emerald.

Television dramas set in Emerald
Solo One is a TV series screened in 1976 set in Emerald, about a local (fictional) policeman dealing with crime in Emerald.

Filming of A Country Practice in the fictional town of Wandin Valley was moved to Emerald when the show moved to Network Ten for one series in 1994.

Filming for the ABC children's drama Come Midnight Monday was effected in and around Emerald, Belgrave & Cockatoo, depicting the fictional country town of Widgery.

Notable people

Kade Simpson, Australian rules football player
Matthew Lobbe, Australian rules football player
Vanessa Amorosi, singer-songwriter
Red Symons, musician and media personality
Alfred Gregory, mountaineer, explorer and photographer
Jesse Martin, sailor

See also
 Shire of Pakenham — Parts of Emerald were previously within this former local government area.
 Shire of Sherbrooke — Parts of Emerald were previously within this former local government area.

References

External links
 Australian Places - Emerald
Eastern Dandenong Ranges  
 Emerald Volunteer Fire Brigade - Protecting Your Community

Suburbs of the Shire of Cardinia
Suburbs of Yarra Ranges